Julian Lelieveld (born 24 November 1997) is a Dutch professional footballer who plays for RKC Waalwijk as a right-back.

Club career

Vitesse
Born in Arnhem, Lelieveld joined Vitesse Arnhem's youth setup in 2005, aged eight, after playing for VV Hattem. He made his professional debut on 30 July 2015, coming on as a late substitute for fellow youth graduate Kevin Diks in a 3–0 away loss against Southampton, for the season's UEFA Europa League. On 1 May 2016, Lelieveld made his league debut in a 3–1 defeat against Utrecht, in which he featured for the entirety of the fixture along with Thomas Oude Kotte.

Ahead of the 2016–17 campaign, Lelieveld was promoted to the first team along with several other academy teammates including Arshak Koryan, Thomas Oude Kotte, Zhang Yuning, Jeroen Houwen and Mitchell van Bergen. Along with his promotion, he was reassigned the number 29, after holding the number 49 last season.

On 25 May 2018, Lelieveld agreed to join Eerste Divisie side Go Ahead Eagles on a season-long loan.

In the summer of 2022, Lelieveld signed a three-year contract with RKC Waalwijk.

Career statistics

References

External links
 Vitesse profile 
 Vitesse Jeugd profile 
 
 
 

1997 births
Living people
Footballers from Arnhem
Dutch footballers
Association football defenders
Netherlands youth international footballers
Eredivisie players
Eerste Divisie players
SBV Vitesse players
Go Ahead Eagles players
De Graafschap players
RKC Waalwijk players
20th-century Dutch people
21st-century Dutch people